Adventurer (Swedish: En äventyrare) is a 1942 Swedish historical adventure film directed by Gunnar Olsson and starring Sture Lagerwall, Ingrid Backlin and Margit Manstad. It was shot at the Sundbyberg Studios in Stockholm. The film's sets were designed by the art director Max Linder. It is loosely based on the life of the seventeenth century writer Lars Wivallius.

Cast
 Sture Lagerwall as 	Lars Wiwallius / Eric Gyllenstierna
 Ingrid Backlin as 	Gertrud Grijp
 Margit Manstad as Theresa Palditska
 Wiktor Andersson as 	Jesper Bock 
 Thor Modéen as Wulff Grijp
 Gull Natorp as 	Helena Daa
 Hilding Gavle as 	Peder
 Henrik Dyfverman as 	Gustaf II Adolf
 Olof Sandborg as 	Richelieu
 Tore Lindwall as 	Wallenstein
 Willy Peters as 	Rönnow Bille
 Bror Bügler as 	Casten Bille
 Gunnar Björnstrand as Count Conti
 Olle Hilding as 	Pater Josef
 Tord Stål as 	de Trevillac
 Blenda Bruno as 	Agneta
 Arne Lindblad as 	Charlot, Gyllenstierna's servant
 Hartwig Fock as Boat captain
 Gunnel Broström as Alice
 Ingemar Holde as 	Anders
 Charlie Almlöf as 	Astrologer
 Erik Rosén as Judge
 Ann-Margret Bergendahl as 	Kätchen
 Åke Claesson as 	Dr. Schonæus
 Georg Fernqvist as 	Raath 
 Agda Helin as 	Margareta 
 Hugo Jacobsson as 	Nikodemus
 Gideon Wahlberg as Innkeeper
 Stig Johanson as 	Farm-Hand 
 Curt Masreliez as Servant at Gyllenstierna's 
 Gunnel Wadner as 	Wedding Guest 
 Artur Cederborgh as 	Guest at the wedding

References

Bibliography 
 Klossner, Michael. The Europe of 1500-1815 on Film and Television: A Worldwide Filmography of Over 2550 Works, 1895 Through 2000. McFarland, 2002.

External links 
 

1942 films
1942 adventure films
1940s Swedish-language films
Films directed by Gunnar Olsson
Swedish historical adventure films
1940s historical adventure films
Films set in the 17th century
1940s Swedish films